Gündoğan is a village in the Ardeşen District, Rize Province, in Black Sea Region of Turkey. Its population is 160 (2021).

History 
According to list of villages in Laz language book (2009), name of the village is Mutafi. According to Avarız source from 1861, name of the village is Yovanvati. Most villagers are ethnically Laz.

Geography

References

Villages in Ardeşen District
Laz settlements in Turkey